Carl Michael Yastrzemski (nicknamed "Yaz"; born August 22, 1939) is an American former Major League Baseball player. He was elected to the Baseball Hall of Fame in 1989. Yastrzemski played his entire 23-year Major League career with the Boston Red Sox (1961–1983). He started his career primarily as a left fielder, but also played 33 games as a third baseman. Later in his career he was mainly a first baseman and designated hitter. Yastrzemski is an 18-time All-Star, the possessor of seven Gold Gloves, a member of the 3,000 hit club, and the first American League player in that club to also accumulate over 400 home runs. He is second on the all-time list for games played, and third for total at-bats. He is the Red Sox' all-time leader in career RBIs, runs, hits, singles, doubles, total bases, and games played, and is third on the team's list for home runs, behind Ted Williams and David Ortiz.

In  Yastrzemski achieved a peak in his career, leading the Red Sox to the American League pennant for the first time in over two decades and being voted the 1967 American League MVP. Yastrzemski also won the Triple Crown that year, something not accomplished again in the Major Leagues until Miguel Cabrera did so in 2012.

Early life
Yastrzemski was born in Southampton, New York to Carl Yastrzemski, Sr. and Hattie Skonieczny. Both his parents were of a Polish background, and young Carl was bilingual from an early age. Raised on his father's potato farm, Carl played on sandlot baseball teams with his father, who, he maintains, was a better athlete than he was. He graduated in 1957 from Bridgehampton School. Yastrzemski also played Little League Baseball, and became the first Little League player to be inducted into the Baseball Hall of Fame. He attended Notre Dame on a basketball scholarship (his career Long Island high school scoring mark at Bridgehampton broke one previously held by Jim Brown) briefly before embarking on his baseball career.

The organization moved him to the Minneapolis Millers for that post-season and the  season. Yastrzemski, who had studied business at Notre Dame, fulfilled a promise to his parents by finishing his degree at Merrimack College in North Andover, Massachusetts, in 1966.

Major League career

Early career
From the beginning, there was tremendous pressure on him to perform, as he succeeded to the position of the great Red Sox legend Ted Williams. He proved to be a worthy successor at the plate, and a far superior defensive player with a strong arm, expert in playing off the Green Monster, Fenway Park's left-field wall. In 12 years as a left fielder, Yastrzemski won seven Gold Gloves and led in assists seven times.

1967
Yastrzemski's Triple Crown win in 1967 was the last time a major league hitter won the Batting Triple Crown until Miguel Cabrera in the 2012 season (conversely, six different pitchers have since won the pitchers' version). He was voted Most Valuable Player almost unanimously (one voter chose César Tovar of the Twins). His 12.4 WAR was the highest since Babe Ruth's 1927 season.

1967 was the season of the "Impossible Dream" for the Red Sox (referring to the hit song from the musical Man of La Mancha), who rebounded from a ninth-place finish a year before to win the American League pennant (their first since ) on the last day of the season. With the Red Sox battling as part of a four-team pennant race, Yastrzemski hit .513 (23 hits in 44 at-bats) with five home runs and 16 runs batted in over the last two weeks of the season, and finished a mere one game ahead of the Detroit Tigers and Minnesota Twins. The Red Sox went into the final two games of the season trailing the Twins by 1 game and leading the Tigers by 1/2 game. Their final two games were against Minnesota with the pennant and home run title (and hence, the triple crown) on the line. In the Saturday game, Yaz went 3 for 4 with a home run and 4 RBI. Killebrew also homered, but the Red Sox won, 6–4. Thus the teams went into the final game tied for 1st place, and Yaz and Killebrew were tied with 44 home runs apiece. In the final game, neither player homered, but Yaz went 4 for 4 with 2 RBI in the Red Sox' 5–3 win. So in the two games with the pennant on the line, Yastrzemski was 7 for 8 with 6 RBI.

The Red Sox lost the World Series four games to three to the St. Louis Cardinals, losing three times to Bob Gibson. Yaz batted .400 with 3 home runs and 5 RBI in the series. That season, he also won the Hickok Belt as top professional athlete of the year and Sports Illustrated magazine's "Sportsman of the Year" Award.

In an article he co-wrote for the November 1967 issue of SPORT magazine, Yastrzemski credited Boston's remarkable season to manager Dick Williams and an infusion of youth, including Rico Petrocelli and Tony Conigliaro. Of Williams, Yastrzemski wrote: "He got rid of all the individuality, made us into a team, gave us an incentive, and made us want to win."

Later career

In  Yastrzemski again won the batting championship. Because of the competitive advantages pitchers enjoyed between 1963 and 1968 (before the lowering of the pitcher's mound), Yastrzemski's .301 mark in "The Year of the Pitcher" is the lowest average of any batting champion in major league history; he was the only hitter in the American League to hit .300 that season against such formidable pitching, and led the league in on-base percentage and walks.

In , Yastrzemski had the first of two consecutive 40-home run seasons as he led the Red Sox to third-place finishes that year and the next. He is one of two players to win the All-Star Game MVP Award despite playing for the losing team, Brooks Robinson having done so in 1966. Yastrzemski's .329 batting average that season was his career high, but he finished second behind the California Angels' Alex Johnson for the batting title by less than .001. In 1970 Yaz led the league in slugging and on-base percentage, finishing third in home runs. In the early '70s, Yaz suffered hand injuries that drastically reduced his power and productivity until healed. He also suffered a permanent shoulder injury that reduced his power, causing him to change his distinctive batting stance.  
Although he hit but 61 home runs over the next four years (1971–1974) as the Red Sox finished second twice and third twice, he finished in the top 10 in batting, and top three in on-base percentage and walks in 1973 and 1974, and led the league in runs scored in 1974.

In the 1975 All-Star Game, Yastrzemski was called to pinch-hit in the sixth inning, with two men on base and the American League down 3–0. Without wearing a batting helmet, he hit Tom Seaver's first pitch for a home run to tie the score. The three-run homer was the only scoring the American League did that night as they lost 6–3.

He made the final out in Game 7 on a fly out to center, trailing by one run. Coincidentally, he also made the final out of the 1978 American League East tie-breaker game with a foul pop to third base. This game featured Bucky Dent's famous homer (although Reggie Jackson's was the eventual winning run). Earlier in the game, Yastrzemski began the scoring with a home run off left-handed pitcher Ron Guidry, who was having a career year (25 wins, 3 losses and a 1.74 ERA). It was the only homer the Cy Young Award winner allowed to a left-hander all season.

On May 19, 1976, Yastrzemski hit three home runs against the Detroit Tigers at Tiger Stadium. He then went to Yankee Stadium and hit two more, tying the major league record of five home runs in two consecutive games.
In 1978 Yastrzemski, then 39, was one of the five oldest players in the league. On September 12, 1979, Yastrzemski achieved another milestone, becoming the first American League player with 3,000 career hits and 400 home runs. In 1982, playing primarily as a designated hitter, an early season hitting streak placed him among the league's leading hitters and saw him featured on the cover of Sports Illustrated and played in that year's All-Star game.

Retirement

Yastrzemski retired at the end of the 1983 season at age 44, though he wrote in his autobiography Yaz that he was planning on playing the 1984 season until he was tired from a long midseason slump. He also said that had he known how good Roger Clemens would be, he would have played in 1984 to have had a chance to play with him.

No player has had a longer career with only one team, 23 seasons, a record he shares with Brooks Robinson of the Baltimore Orioles. His final career statistics include 3,308 games played (second all-time and the most with a single team), 3,419 hits, 646 doubles, 452 home runs, 1,844 RBIs, and a batting average of .285. He had 1,845 walks in his career, and 1,157 extra base hits. Yastrzemski was the first player to collect over 3,000 hits and 400 home runs solely in the American League (the feat has since been accomplished by Cal Ripken Jr.). He was named to the All-Star Game 18 times. Yastrzemski won three American League batting championships in his career. In addition, he trails only Ty Cobb and Derek Jeter in hits collected with a single team, and trails only Cobb, Jeter and Tris Speaker in hits collected playing in the American League. Yastrzemski is also Fenway Park's all-time leader in hits, doubles, and RBIs. By the time of his retirement, he was the all-time leader in plate appearances, since surpassed by Pete Rose.

As one of the top players of his era, he was elected to the Baseball Hall of Fame in 1989, his first year of eligibility, with the support of 94% of voters. He is one of the few Hall of Famers to directly succeed another Hall of Famer at the same position.  For his entire career with the Red Sox, he wore uniform number 8. The Red Sox retired this number on August 6, 1989, after Yastrzemski was elected to the Hall of Fame. In 1999, Yastrzemski ranked 72nd on The Sporting News''' list of the 100 Greatest Baseball Players. That same season, he was named a finalist to the Major League Baseball All-Century Team. Prior to his induction in the Baseball Hall of Fame, in 1986, Yastrzemski was inducted into the National Polish-American Sports Hall of Fame. He was inducted into the Suffolk Sports Hall of Fame on Long Island in the Baseball Category with the Class of 1990.

Yastrzemski was well known for his batting stance, holding his bat exceptionally high, giving his swing a large, dramatic arc (unexpectedly so for a well-known "fastball hitter"), and more power at the plate. In his later years, he adjusted his stance and held the bat lower. In his autobiography, he revealed that he played his last 8 years with a damaged left shoulder he kept secret, and said this injury reduced his home run power. Before that, he could hit home runs to all fields, but afterward, his home run power was mainly in pulling the ball. This is why he no longer held the bat high and used several batting stances to adjust to the injured shoulder. He explained that with each new stance, he had to change the way he swung. This is why he never came close to hitting 40 home runs again. He was also known for modifying his batting helmets by enlarging the right earhole (for comfort) and removing part of the right earflap (for better vision of the ball as it was being pitched).

"Yaz" stood out for his cagey approach to the game. He decoyed opposing baserunners with his left-field play. On fly balls headed for Fenway's Wall, he lined up as if about to make the catch just in front of the wall, waiting until the last possible moment before wheeling around to play the carom.  This would fool baserunners into tagging up for precious extra seconds, preventing them from taking an extra base, and if they tried anyway, his deft handling of the bounce and accurate throwing arm were liable to make them pay the price. Once while running the basepaths himself, Yastrzemski found a unique way to induce a throwing error. Thrown out at second base, he failed to head immediately for the dugout, as is customary. Opponents made a protracted attempt at tagging out another runner in a rundown or "pickle", but soon were flabbergasted to see a Red Sox player rounding third and heading for home. A panicked throw to the catcher far missed the mark, allowing Yastrzemski to appear to score, but more importantly, allowing the runner behind him to advance.

A record album of the Red Sox's 1967 season, aptly titled The Impossible Dream, featured a song by DJ Jess Cain of praise for "The man they call Yaz", which included the line "Although 'Yastrzemski' is a lengthy name / It fits quite nicely in our Hall of Fame." The song can be heard, and the album cover seen, in the apartment of Ben Wrightman (played by Jimmy Fallon) in the 2005 film Fever Pitch''. Earlier in the film, Ben's girlfriend, Lindsay Meeks (Drew Barrymore), not yet familiar with the triumphs and tribulations of the Red Sox, is unable to properly pronounce Yastrzemski's name, and has to be corrected by the surrounding fans: "Ya-STREM-ski!" The final scene of the movie indicates that if the couple's unborn child is a girl she will be named "Carla Yastrzemski Wrightman".

Yastrzemski thought that Tommy John was one of the hardest pitchers for him to hit against. This surprised John, who remembered Yastrzemski hitting him well while he was with the White Sox (1965-71). John concluded that Yastrzemski must be remembering his years with the Yankees beginning in 1979, when John fared better in their matchups.

Along with Johnny Pesky, Yastrzemski raised the 2004 World Series championship banner over Fenway Park. He is currently a roving instructor with the Red Sox, and was honored by throwing out the ceremonial first pitch for Game 1 of the 2004, 2007, 2013, and 2018 World Series. In August 2008, Yastrzemski underwent successful triple bypass heart surgery at Massachusetts General Hospital. The Red Sox honored him with a statue outside Fenway Park on September 23, 2013.

Family

Carl's son Carl Michael Yastrzemski Jr., known as Mike, played college baseball for the Florida State Seminoles and was drafted by the Atlanta Braves in the third round in 1984. He started his professional career with the Durham Bulls and eventually played for two Chicago White Sox affiliated teams in the Triple-A Pacific Coast League, first with the Hawaii Islanders in 1987 and then ending his playing career with the Vancouver Canadians in 1988. He died in 2004 at age 43 from a blood clot after having hip surgery.

Carl's grandson Mike Yastrzemski, Carl Jr.'s son, was drafted by the Red Sox in 2009 and the Seattle Mariners in 2012. However, he did not sign with either team, as he played college baseball for the Vanderbilt Commodores. He signed with the Baltimore Orioles after being selected in the 2013 MLB draft. He rose through Baltimore's farm system, reaching Triple-A with the Norfolk Tides by 2016. In March 2019, he was traded to the San Francisco Giants organization, and he made his MLB debut with the Giants on May 25, 2019.

On September 17, 2019, as a member of the Giants, in his first game played at Fenway Park, Mike went 2-for-7 with a home run and a double. In the next game of the series on September 18, 2019, Carl threw out the ceremonial first pitch to Mike.

Career regular season statistics
Through the end of the 2017 season, on the all-time lists for Major League Baseball, Yastrzemski ranks first for games played for one team, second for games played, third for at-bats, sixth for bases on balls, eighth for doubles, ninth for hits, ninth for total bases, 13th for extra-base hits, and 14th for RBIs.

See also

 Boston Red Sox Hall of Fame
 List of Boston Red Sox award winners
 List of Boston Red Sox team records
 List of Major League Baseball annual doubles leaders
 List of Major League Baseball annual runs scored leaders
 List of Major League Baseball career assists as a left fielder leaders
 List of Major League Baseball career bases on balls leaders
 List of Major League Baseball career doubles leaders
 List of Major League Baseball career games played leaders
 List of Major League Baseball career home run leaders
 List of Major League Baseball career hits leaders
 List of Major League Baseball career putouts as a left fielder leaders
 List of Major League Baseball career runs batted in leaders
 List of Major League Baseball career runs scored leaders
 List of Major League Baseball career total bases leaders
 List of Major League Baseball doubles records
 List of Major League Baseball players to hit for the cycle
 List of Major League Baseball players who spent their entire career with one franchise

Notes

Further reading

External links

Carl Yastrzemski at Baseball Almanac
Carl Yastrzemski Official Site

1939 births
Living people
People from Southampton (town), New York
American people of Polish descent
American League All-Stars
American League batting champions
American League home run champions
American League Most Valuable Player Award winners
American League RBI champions
American League Triple Crown winners
Baseball players from New York (state)
Boston Red Sox players
Gold Glove Award winners
Major League Baseball All-Star Game MVPs
Major League Baseball designated hitters
Major League Baseball left fielders
Major League Baseball players with retired numbers
Merrimack College alumni
Minneapolis Millers (baseball) players
National Baseball Hall of Fame inductees
Notre Dame Fighting Irish baseball players
Raleigh Capitals players
People from Bridgehampton, New York
Sportspeople from Suffolk County, New York